Anoyo is the tenth studio album by Canadian musician Tim Hecker. It was released on May 10, 2019 under Kranky.

Background
The album was recorded in the Jiunzan Mandala-Temple Kanzouin in Tokyo, at the same time as Hecker's 2018 album Konoyo.

Critical reception
Anoyo was met with generally favorable reviews from critics. At Metacritic, which assigns a weighted average rating out of 100 to reviews from mainstream publications, this release received an average score of 79, based on 13 reviews.

Accolades

Track listing

Notes
 All tracks are stylized in sentence case, excluding the word "Konoyo". For example, "That World" is stylized as "That world".

References

2019 albums
Kranky albums
Tim Hecker albums